Newcastle University School of Medicine is the medical school at Newcastle University in England. It was established in 1834 in the city of Newcastle upon Tyne and served as the College of Medicine in connection with Durham University from 1851 to 1870 and then, as a full college of the university, Durham University College of Medicine from 1870 to 1937 when it joined Armstrong College, to form King's College, Durham. In 1963 King's College became the University of Newcastle upon Tyne. The university now uses the name "Newcastle University".

Curriculum 
The medical school follows a modern, integrated, systems-based curriculum, and was the first medical school in the country to operate an integrated medical curriculum. It operated in partnership with Durham University's medical school, which was based at the university's Queen's Campus until 2018 when Durham completed their transfer of its medical school to Newcastle.

Students complete two years of campus-based teaching, followed by three years of largely hospital based teaching. During each of these three years, students are based at an LEP (Local education provider) which roughly corresponds to an NHS Trust. These LEPs can be anywhere within the north east and north Cumbria, however students will spend at least 2 years in an LEP that is a commutable distance from Newcastle.

The medical school also offers an accelerated medical programme, intended for students who have a previous degree in a different (often unrelated) discipline. This lasts four years, the first year covering the same material as the first two years of the five-year course.  Second year "accelerated" students are then taught alongside the third year students from the five-year programme. The medical school offers students the chance to intercalate in a BSc in another area of study after the 2nd year, either at Newcastle University or externally at another university. After, the 4th year, the medical schools also offers students the opportunity to undertake a Master's degree or MRes. Some students complete a PhD following the completion of an intercalated master's degree. After completing the extra year(s), students resume their medical studies.

Reputation and rankings 
Newcastle Medical School consistently ranks as one of the top medical schools in the UK due to high levels of teaching and research; it is ranked in the top 10 UK medical schools by the Complete University Guide (8th), the Guardian (6th) and the Sunday Times (7th). It is the first institution in the UK to be given permission to pursue stem-cell research. The BMC Medicine journal reported medical graduates from Oxford, Cambridge and Newcastle performed better in postgraduate tests than any other medical school in the UK.

As of 2020 the medical school admits some 367 students per year (including 26 from overseas) making it one of the largest medical schools in the UK. According to UCAS, Cambridge, Oxford and Newcastle are the most academically selective universities for entry to study medicine in the United Kingdom. During the 2020 admissions cycle for both the 4-year A101 graduate and 5-year A100 undergraduate MBBS course, there were 10 applicants for every place. Prospective students applying to the medical school for both the standard (5-year) and accelerated (4-year) programmes are required to sit the UCAT admission test. The most recent UCAT cut-off for invitation to interview for the A100 and A101 courses was 2730 and 2920 respectively for 2020 entry (scores in the 85th and 95th percentile of test-takers).

Malaysian campus 
In 2008 the university announced that they were entering into an agreement to establish an international branch campus in Malaysia for the teaching of medical subjects. The development of the  site in Johor, marks Newcastle University Medicine Malaysia (NUMed) as the 'anchor tenant' within the EduCity.

Staff moved into the NUMed Malaysia buildings in May 2011, in preparation for students arriving in August. The Malaysian Bell's Court building features a section which is designed to look like the Arches in Newcastle upon Tyne. The International Campus offers MBBS, which is currently accredited by both the General Medical Council and Malaysian Medical Council and Undergraduate Degrees in Biomedical sciences. Both programmes lead to a Newcastle University degree, and are identical to the course in the UK. The MBBS programme is recognised across the globe, with the medical school listed in the World Directory of Medical Schools 

The main clinical teaching hospitals are Hospital Sultan Ismail and Hospital Sultanah Aminah in Johor Bahru, Hospital Sultanah Nora Ismail in Batu Pahat, Hospital Enche’ Besar Hajjah Khalsom in Kluang and a number of community clinics. All teaching and examinations are conducted in English, with the use of translators in clinical settings if required. Opportunities exist for students to spend time in the UK Campus, both through Student Selected Components (SSC), electives and intercalation.

There are currently over 700 students enrolled, from all over Malaysia and many countries of the world. There have been four cohorts of graduates from the MBBS programme (January 2018), with over 170 students. The Biomedical Sciences programme is a 2+1, with the final research-intensive year being conducted in the UK. It has graduated two cohorts of students to date. The Foundation in Science course opened in 2016, and students are guaranteed a place on the Biomedical Science or Medical degree programmes if they meet the academic criteria - in 2017 all met the criteria, and 86% chose to progress at NUMed.

The Medical Society (MedSoc)
Established in 1879, The Medical Society is the student society for all medical students at Newcastle University. MedSoc is run by a committee of 8 third year medical students. The Medical Society is not affiliated with Newcastle University Student Union.

Deans and Pro-Vice-Chancellors 
Following the merger of the College of Medicine with Armstrong College in 1937 the position of Dean of Medicine was created with a large degree of autonomy. A reorganisation of the university in 2002 led to this role being transferred to the Pro-Vice-Chancellor for Medical Sciences.

Deans of Medicine 1937–2002

Pro-Vice-Chancellors (Medical Sciences) from 2002

References

External links 
 Newcastle University School of Medicine at Newcastle University
 NUMed Malaysia at Newcastle University Medicine Malaysia

Medical schools in England
Medical School
Educational institutions established in 1834
1834 establishments in England